The Rt Revd Professor David Kodiah is the second and current Anglican Bishop of Bondo, serving from 2017.

Kodiah was educated at school in Kisumu; Charles University and Northwestern Christian University. He was Principal of St. Philips Theological College Maseno from 1996 to 1998; and then of Bishop Okkulu College, Great Lakes University of Kisumu from 1998.

References

21st-century Anglican bishops of the Anglican Church of Kenya
Anglican bishops of Bondo
Living people
Charles University alumni
Bushnell University alumni
Academic staff of Great Lakes University of Kisumu
Year of birth missing (living people)